Knowle is a district and council ward in the south east of the city of Bristol in England, United Kingdom. It is bordered by Filwood Park to the west, Brislington to the east, Whitchurch and Hengrove to the south and Totterdown to the north. The settlement was mentioned in the Domesday Book as Canole. Knowle comes from the old English word for hillock, which means a little hill.

Broadwalk shopping centre provides a number of shopping and leisure facilities, plus the local library. Further amenities are located along Wells Road, which runs through Knowle from Totterdown to Whitchurch, and on Broadwalk, a tree lined boulevard that heads westwards towards Filwood. Over the road to the south of the shopping centre are several sports clubs, namely Knowle Cricket Club, Knowle Tennis Club and Knowle Bowls Club.

Redcatch Park is the main green space with football pitches, children's play area, a MUGA (Multi Games Area), tennis courts and a croquet club. This is supported by The Friends of Redcatch Park, a group of local residents who help Bristol City Council enhance and protect the space and who organise events in the park.

Community groups operate in and around the Knowle area. Redcatch Community Association run the Redcatch Centre in Redcatch Road, on the boundary of Redcatch Park – a resource for community groups and private and public events. Clubs and groups include the Knowle and Totterdown Local History Group, Redcatch Rollers (Short Mat Bowling), Redcatch Tea Dance, and Redcatch Art Club who all meet at Redcatch Community Centre. Knowle Community Association run a community centre in The Square, Knowle Park, with activities including Knowle East Youth Club.  Other organisations are Broad Walk Neighbourhood Watch, which acts as a portal for the local community of Knowle and those in and around Broad Walk, and the St John Ambulance Knowle & Totterdown Division.

There are good views of the city just above Perrett Park, along Sylvia Avenue which is lined by Victorian terraces.

See also 
 Knowle West

References

External links 

 
 Map of Knowle circa 1900

Areas of Bristol
Wards of Bristol
Places formerly in Somerset